WOOK may refer to:

 WOOK-LD, a low-power television station (channel 15, virtual 21) licensed to serve Meridian, Mississippi, United States
 WBIG-FM, a radio station (100.3 FM) licensed to serve Washington, D.C., United States, which held the call sign WOOK from 1976 to 1984
 WOOK-TV, a defunct television station (channel 14) formerly licensed to serve Washington, D.C.
 WOOK (AM), a defunct radio station (1340 AM) formerly licensed to serve Washington, D.C.
 WLXE, a radio station (1600 AM) licensed to serve Rockville, Maryland, United States, which held the call sign WOOK from 1947 to 1951